Durga Puja, also known as Durgotsava or Sharodotsava, is an annual Hindu festival originating in the Indian subcontinent which reveres and pays homage to the Hindu goddess Durga and is also celebrated because of Durga's victory over Mahishasura. It is celebrated all over the world by the Hindu Bengali community but it is particularly popular and traditionally celebrated in the Indian states of West Bengal, Bihar, Assam, Tripura, Odisha, Jharkhand, Uttar Pradesh (eastern parts) and the country of Bangladesh. The festival is observed in the Indian calendar month of Ashwin, which corresponds to September–October in the Gregorian calendar. Durga Puja is a ten-day festival, of which the last five are of the most significance. The puja is performed in homes and public, the latter featuring a temporary stage and structural decorations (known as pandals). The festival is also marked by scripture recitations, performance arts, revelry, gift-giving, family visits, feasting, and public processions. Durga Puja is an important festival in the Shaktism tradition of Hinduism. Durga Puja in Kolkata has been inscribed on the Intangible cultural heritage list of UNESCO in December of 2021.

As per Hindu scriptures, the festival marks the victory of goddess Durga in her battle against the shape-shifting asura, Mahishasura. Thus, the festival epitomizes the victory of good over evil, though it is also in part a harvest festival celebrating the goddess as the motherly power behind all of life and creation. Durga Puja coincides with Navaratri and Dussehra celebrations observed by other traditions of Hinduism.

The primary goddess revered during Durga Puja is Durga but celebrations also include other major deities of Hinduism such as Lakshmi (the goddess of wealth and prosperity), Saraswati (the goddess of knowledge and music), Ganesha (the god of good beginnings), and Kartikeya (the god of war). In Bengali and Odia traditions, these deities are considered to be Durga's children, and Durga Puja is believed to commemorate Durga's visit to her natal home with her beloved children. The festival is preceded by Mahalaya, which is believed to mark the start of Durga's journey to her natal home. Primary celebrations begin on the sixth day (Shasthi), on which the goddess is welcomed with rituals. The festival ends on the tenth day (Vijaya Dashami) when devotees embark on a procession carrying the worshipped clay sculpture-idols to a river, or other water body, and immerse them, symbolic of her return to the divine cosmos and her marital home with Shiva in Kailash. Regional and community variations in celebration of the festival and rituals observed exist.

Durga Puja is an old tradition of Hinduism, though its exact origins are unclear. Surviving manuscripts from the 14th—century provide guidelines for Durga Puja, while historical records suggest that royalty and wealthy families were sponsoring major Durga Puja festivities since at least the 16th-century. The prominence of Durga Puja increased during the British Raj in the provinces of Bengal, Odisha and Assam. However, in modern times, the importance of Durga Puja is more as a social and cultural festival than a religious one, wherever it is observed.

Over the years, Durga Puja has morphed into an inseparable part of Indian culture with a diverse group of people celebrating this festival in their unique way while on tradition.

Names
In West Bengal, Odisha, Assam, and Tripura, Durga Puja is also called Akalbodhan (literally, "untimely awakening of Durga"), Sharadiya pujo ("autumnal worship"), Sharodotsab ("festival of autumn"), Maha pujo ("grand puja"), Maayer pujo ("worship of the Mother"), Durga pujo, or merely Puja or Pujo. In Bangladesh, Durga Puja has historically been celebrated as Bhagabati puja. Maa Durga is known as the Goddess of Power (feminine) which represents triumph of Goodness over evil.

Durga Puja is also referred to by the names of related Shakta Hindu festivals such as Navaratri, celebrated on the same days elsewhere in India; such as in Bihar, Jharkhand, Gujarat, Uttar Pradesh, Punjab, Kerala, and Maharashtra, Kullu dussehra, celebrated in Kullu Valley, Himachal Pradesh; Mysore dussehra celebrated in Mysore, Karnataka; Bommai golu, celebrated in Tamil Nadu; Bommala koluvu, celebrated in Andhra Pradesh; and Bathukamma, celebrated in Telangana.

History and origins

Durga is an ancient deity of Hinduism according to available archeological and textual evidence. However, the origins of Durga Puja are unclear and undocumented. Surviving manuscripts from the 14th-century provide guidelines for Durga Puja, while historical records suggest the royalty and wealthy families to be sponsoring major Durga Puja public festivities, since at least the 16th-century. The 11th or 12th-century Jain text Yasatilaka by Somadeva mentions an annual festival dedicated to a warrior goddess, celebrated by the king and his armed forces, and the description mirrors attributes of Durga Puja.

The name Durga, and related terms, appear in Vedic literature, such as in the Rigveda hymns 4.28, 5.34, 8.27, 8.47, 8.93 and 10.127, and in sections 10.1 and 12.4 of the Atharvaveda A deity named Durgi appears in section 10.1.7 of the Taittiriya Aranyaka. While the Vedic literature uses the word Durga, the description therein lacks legendary details about her or about Durga Puja that is found in later Hindu literature. A key text associated with Durga Puja is Devi Mahatmya, which is recited during the festival. Durga was likely well established by the time this Hindu text was composed, which scholars variously estimate Durgato date between 400 and 600 CE. The Devi Mahatmya scripture describes the nature of evil forces symbolised by Mahishasura as shape-shifting, deceptive, and adapting in nature, in form and in strategy to create difficulties and thus achieve their evil ends. Durga calmly understands and counters the evil in order to achieve her solemn goals.Durga, in her various forms, appears as an independent deity in the Indian texts. Both Yudhisthira and Arjuna characters of the Mahabharata invoke hymns to Durga. She appears in Harivamsa in the form of Vishnu's eulogy and in Pradyumna's prayer. The prominent mention of Durga in such epics may have led to her worship.The Indian texts with mentions of Durga Puja are inconsistent. A legend found in some versions of the Puranas mentions it to be a spring festival, while the Devi-Bhagavata Purana and two other Shakta Puranas mentions it to be an autumn festival. The Ramayana manuscripts are also inconsistent. Versions of Ramayana found in the north, west, and south of the Indian subcontinent describe Rama to be remembering Surya (the Hindu sun god) before his battle against Ravana, but the Bengali manuscripts of Ramayana, such as the 15th-century manuscript by Krttivasa, mention Rama to be worshipping Durga. As per the legend, Lord Rama worshipped Durga in the autumn to have her blessings before defeating Ravana. While he was preparing for the worship of the goddess, the goddess Durga hid one of the 108 flowers of lotus, very essential for her worship. Having found only 107 of 108 lotuses at the time of the worship, Lord Rama decided to offer one of his eyes in place of that lost flower. When he was about to offer his eye,  Goddess Durga appeared and told him that she had only hidden the flower in order to testify his devotion and she was satisfied with it. She blessed Lord Rama and Lord Rama continued with her worship, which is better known by Akaal Bodhan in the context. According to some scholars, the worship of the fierce warrior goddess Durga, and her darker and more violent manifestation Kali, became popular in the Bengal region during and after the medieval era, marked by Muslim invasions and conquests.
The significance of Durga and other goddesses in Hindu culture is stated to have increased after Islamicate armies conquered regions of the Indian subcontinent. According to yet other scholars, the marginalization of Bengali Hindus during the medieval era led to a reassertion of Hindu identity and an emphasis on Durga Puja as a social festival, publicly celebrating the warrior goddess.From the medieval era up to present-day, Durga Puja has been celebrated as a socio-cultural event, while maintaining the roots of religious worship.

Rituals and practices
Durga Puja is a ten-day event, of which the last five days involve certain rituals and practices. The festival begins with Mahalaya, a day on which Hindus perform tarpaṇa by offering water and food to their dead ancestors. The day also marks the advent of Durga from her mythological marital home in Kailash. The next significant day of the festival is the sixth day (Sashthi), on which devotees welcomes the goddess and festive celebrations are inaugurated. On the seventh day (Saptami), eighth (Ashtami) and ninth (Navami) days, the goddess along with Lakshmi, Saraswati, Ganesha, and Kartikeya are revered and these days mark the main days of worship with recitation of scriptures, puja, legends of Durga in Devi Mahatmya, social visits to elaborately decorated and illuminated pandals (temporary structures meant for hosting the puja), among others.
Durga Puja is, in part, a post-monsoon harvest festival observed on the same days in the Shaktism tradition of Hinduism as those in its other traditions. The practice of including a bundle of nine different plants, called navapatrika, as a symbolism of Durga, is a testament practice to its agricultural importance. The typically selected plants include not only representative important crops, but also non-crops. This probably signifies the Hindu belief that the goddess is "not merely the power inherent in the growth of crops but the power inherent in all vegetation". The festival is a social and public event in the eastern and northeastern states of India, where it dominates religious and socio-cultural life, with temporary pandals built at community squares, roadside shrines, and temples. The festival is also observed by some Shakta Hindus as a private home-based festival.The festival starts at twilight with prayers to Saraswati. She is believed to be another aspect of goddess Durga, and who is the external and internal activity of all existence, in everything and everywhere. This is typically also the day on which the eyes of the deities on the representative clay sculpture-idols are painted, bringing them to a lifelike appearance. The day also marks prayers to Ganesha and visit to pandals temples.Day two to five mark the remembrance of the goddess and her manifestations, such as Kumari (goddess of fertility), Mai (mother), Ajima (grandmother), Lakshmi (goddess of wealth) and in some regions as the Saptamatrikas (seven mothers) or Navadurga (nine aspects of Durga). On the sixth day major festivities and social celebrations start.  The first nine days overlap with Navaratri festivities in other traditions of Hinduism.The puja rituals involve mantras (words manifesting spiritual transformation), shlokas (holy verses), chants and arati, and offerings. These also include Vedic chants and recitations of the Devi Mahatmya text in Sanskrit. The shlokas and mantras praise the divinity of the goddess; according to the shlokas Durga is omnipresent as the embodiment of power, nourishment, memory, forbearance, faith, forgiveness, intellect, wealth, emotions, desires, beauty, satisfaction, righteousness, fulfillment and peace. The specific practices vary by region.

The rituals before the puja begins include the following:
 Paata Puja:  The process of making an idol usually begins with 'Paata Puja', on the day of the Rath Yatra that usually takes place around July. 'Paata' is the wooden frame that forms the base for the idols.
 Bodhana: Involves rites to awaken and welcome the goddess to be a guest, typically done on the sixth day of the festival. The amorphous sight of the goddess is consecrated into a ghata or noggin while the visible sight is consecrated into the murti or idol. These rituals are known as ghatasthapana and  pranapratistha respectively.
 Adhivasa: Anointing ritual wherein symbolic offerings are made to Durga, with each item representing a remembrance of subtle forms of her. Typically completed on the sixth day as well.
 Navapatrika snan: Bathing of the navapatrika with holy water done on the seventh day of the festival.
 Sandhi puja and Ashtami pushpanjali: The eighth day begins with elaborate pushpanjali rituals. The cusp of the ending of the eighth day and beginning of the ninth day is considered to be the moment when per scriptures Durga engaged in a fierce battle against Mahishasura and was attacked by the demons Chanda and Munda. Goddess Chamunda emerged from the third eye of Durga and killed Chanda and Munda at the cusp of Ashtami and Navami, the eighth and ninth days respectively. This moment is marked by the sandhi puja, involving the offering of 108 lotuses and lighting if 108 lamps. It is a forty-eight minutes long ritual commemorating the climax of battle. The rituals are performed in the last 24 minutes of Ashtami and the first 24 minutes of Navami. In some regions, devotees sacrifice an animal such as a buffalo or goat, but in many regions, there isn't an actual animal sacrifice and a symbolic sacrifice substitutes it. The surrogate effigy is smeared in red vermilion to symbolize the blood spilled. The goddess is then offered food (bhog). Some places also engage in devotional service.

Some places also perform  on this day.
This ritual signifies the wishing of a blissful marital life for married women. Historically the ritual has been restricted to married women. The tenth day is the day when Durga emerged victorious against Mahishasura and it ends with a procession where the clay sculpture-idols are ceremoniously taken to a river or coast for immersion rites. Following the immersion, Durga is believed to return to her mythological marital home of Kailasha to Shiva and the cosmos in general. People distribute sweets and gifts, visit their friends and family members on the tenth day. Some communities such as those near Varanasi mark the day after , called , by visiting a Durga temple.
Drummers called , carrying large leather-strung  create music, to which people dance either during or not during . Some places, especially home pujas, also observe , a ritual involving married women carrying  burning with incense and dried coconuts, on a cloth on their head and hands,

Decorations, sculptures, and stages

The process of the creation of clay sculpture-idols (pratima or murti) for the puja, from the collection of clay to the ornamentation is a ceremonial process. Though the festival is observed post-monsoon harvest, the artisans begin making the sculpture-idols months before, during summer. The process begins with prayers to Ganesha and to the perceived divinity in materials such as bamboo frames in which the sculpture-idols are cast.

Clay, or alluvial soil, collected from different regions form the base. This choice is a tradition wherein Durga, perceived as the creative energy and material, is believed to be present everywhere and in everything in the universe. In certain traditions in Kolkata, a custom is to include soil samples in the clay mixture for Durga from areas believed to be nishiddho pallis (forbidden territories; territories inhabited by the "social outcasts" such as brothels).

The clay base is combined with straw, kneaded, and then molded into a cast made from hay and bamboo. This is layered to a fine final shape, cleaned, painted, and polished. A layer of a fiber called jute, mixed in with clay, is also attached to the top to prevent the statue from cracking in the months ahead. The heads of the statues are more complex and are usually made separately. The limbs of the statues are mostly shaped from bundles of straws. Then, starting about August, the local artisans hand-paint the sculpture-idols which are later dressed in clothing, are decorated and bejewelled, and displayed at the puja altars.

The procedure for and proportions of the sculpture-idols are described in arts-related Sanskrit texts of Hinduism, such as the Vishvakarma Sashtra.

Environmental impact

The sculpture-idols for the puja are traditionally made of biodegradable materials such as straw, clay, soil, and wood. In today's times, brighter colored statues have increased in popularity and have diversified the use of non-biodegradable, cheaper or more colorful substitute synthetic raw materials. Environmental activists have raised concerns about the paint used to produce the statue, stating that the heavy metals in these paints pollute rivers when the statues are immersed at the end of the Durga festival.

Brighter colors that are also biodegradable and eco-friendly, as well as the traditional natural colors, are typically more expensive compared to the non biodegradable paints. The Indian state of West Bengal has banned the use of hazardous paints, and various state government have started distributing lead-free paints to artisans at no cost to prevent pollution.

Animal sacrifice, symbolic sacrifice

Shakta Hindu communities mark the slaying of Mahishasura and the victory of Durga with a symbolic or actual sacrifice. Most communities prefer symbolic sacrifice, where a statue of the asura is made of flour or equivalent, is immolated and smeared with vermilion, symbolic of the blood that had spilled during the battle. Other substitutes include a vegetable or a sweet dish considered equivalent to the animal. In certain instances, devotees consider animal sacrifice distasteful, and practice alternate means of expressing devotion while respecting the views of others in their tradition.

In communities performing actual sacrifice, an animal is sacrificed, mainly at temples. In Nepal, West Bengal, Odisha and Assam, animal sacrifices are performed at Shakta temples to commemorate the legend of Durga slaying Mahishasura. This involves slaying of a fowl, goat or a male water-buffalo. This practice is rare among Hindus outside the regions of Bengal, Odisha and Assam. In these regions, the festival season is primarily when significant animal sacrifices are observed.

The Rajputs of Rajasthan worship their weapons and horses in the related festival of Navaratri, and some historically observed the sacrifice of a goat, a practice that continues in some places. The sacrifice ritual, supervised he the priest, requires slaying of the animal with a single stroke. In the past this ritual was considered a rite of passage into manhood and readiness as a warrior. The Kuldevi (clan deity) among these Rajput communities is a warrior goddess, with local legends tracing reverence for her during Rajput-Muslim wars.

Pandals and theme-based pujas

Months before the start of Durga Puja, youth members of the community collect funds and donations, engage priests and artisans, buy votive materials and help build pandals centered around a theme, which has rose to prominence in recent years. Such themes have included sex work, celebration of humanity, marginalization of queer persons and transgender persons, folk culture, celebration of cinema, womanhood,  pro-environment themes, while others have chosen metaphorical themes such as celebration of maati (literally, soil or ash) and "finding one's own light". Pandals have also been replicated on existing temples, structures, and monuments and yet others have been made of elements such as metal scraps, nails, and turmeric among others. Durga Puja pandals have also been centered around themes to acknowledge political events such as the 2019 Balakot airstrike and to protest against the National Register of Citizens of India.

. The budget required for such theme-based pujas is significantly higher than traditional pujas. For such theme-based pujas, the preparations and the building of pandals are a significant arts-related economic activity, often attracting major sponsors. Such commercialized pujas attract crowds of visitors. The growth of competitiveness in theme-based pandals has escalated costs and scale of Durga Puja in eastern states of India. Some segments of the society criticize the billboards, the economic competition, and seek return to basics. The competition takes many forms, such as the height of statue. In 2015, an 88-foot statue of Durga in Kolkata's Deshapriya Park attracted numerous devotees, with some estimates placing visitors at one million.

Regional celebrations and observances

There exists variation in worship practices and rituals associated with Durga Puja, as is the case with other Hindu festivals, in the Indian subcontinent. Hinduism accepts flexibility and leaves the set of practices to the choice of the individuals concerned. Different localized rituals may be observed regionally, with these variations accepted across temples, pandals, and within families. 

The festival is most commonly associated with Bengali Hindus, and with the community having variability and differences in practices. There may exist differences of practice between the puja of theme-based Pandals, family pujas (with puja of erstwhile aristocrat families known as bonedi puja), and community pujas (known as barowari pujas) of neighbourhoods or apartments.

The rituals of the puja also varies from being Vedic, Puranic, or Tantric, or a combination of these. The Bengali Durga Puja rituals typically combine all three. The non-Bengali Durga Puja rituals tend to be essentially Vedic (srauta) in nature but they too incorporate esoteric elements making the puja an example of a culmination of Vedic-Tantric practices.

Historical evidence suggests that the Durga Puja has evolved over time, becoming more elaborate, social, and creative. The festival had earlier been a domestic puja, a form of practice that still remains popular. But it had also come to be celebrated in the sarvajanin (public) form, where communities get together, pool their resources and efforts to set up pandals and illuminations, and celebrate the event as a "mega-show to share". The origins of this variation are unclear, with some sources suggesting a family in Kolkata reviving such celebration in 1411 CE. While other set of sources suggest that a Bengali landlord, named Kamsanarayan, held a mega-show puja in late 16th-century Bengal. Yet, this festival of Bengal is likely much older with the discovery of 11th and 12th-century Durga Puja manual manuscripts such as Durgotsavaviveka, Durgotsava Prayoga, Vasantaviveka and Kalaviveka. The rituals associated with the Durga Puja migrated to other regions from Bengal, such as in Varanasi, a city that has historically attracted sponsorship from Hindus from various parts of the Indian subcontinent including Bengal. In contemporary India, Durga Puja is celebrated in various styles and forms.

Durga Puja is a widely celebrated festival in the Indian states of West Bengal, Bihar, Jharkhand, Uttar Pradesh (eastern parts), Assam, and Odisha. It is celebrated over a five-day period. Streets are decked up with festive lights, loudspeakers play festive songs as well as recitation of hymns and chants by priests, and pandals are erected by communities. The roads become overcrowded with revellers, devotees, and pandal-hoppers visiting the pandals on puja days. It often creates chaotic traffic conditions. Shops, eateries, and restaurants stay open all night; fairs are also set up and cultural programmes are held. People form organizing committees, which plan and oversee the pandal during the festivities. Today, Durga Puja has turned into a consumerist social carnival, a major public spectacle and a major arts event riding on the wave of commercialisation, corporate sponsorship, and craze for award-winning. For private domestic pujas, families dedicate an area of their homes, known as thakur dalan, for Durga Puja where the sculpture-idols for worship is placed and decorated with home-dyed fabric, sola ornamentations, and gold and silver foil decorations. Elaborate rituals like arati are performed and prasad is distributed after being offered to the deities. As a tradition, married daughters visit their parents and celebrate the Durga Puja with them, a symbolism alluding to Durga who is popularly believed to return to her natal home during the puja.

Durga Puja is also a gift-giving and shopping season for communities celebrating it, with people buying gifts for not only family members but also for close relatives and friends. New clothes are the traditional gift, and people wear them to go out together during Durga Puja. During puja holidays, people may also go to places of tourist attractions while others return home to spend Durga Puja with their family. It's a common trend amongst youngsters and even those who are older to go pandal-hopping and enjoy the celebrations.

The organising committees of each puja pandal hires a purohita (priest) who performs the puja rituals on behalf of the community. For the priests, Durga Puja is a time of activity wherein he pursues the timely completion of Vedic-Puranic-Tantric ritual sequences to make various offerings and perform fire oblations, in full public view, while the socio-cultural festivities occur in parallel. The complex puja rituals include periods of accurate and melodic scripture recitation. The puja involves crowds of people visiting the pandals, with smaller groups visiting family pujas, to witness the celebrations. On the last day, the sculpture-idols are carried out in immersion processions across Bengal, following which they are ritually immersed into rivers or other waterbodies. The immersion ceremony continues till a couple of days after the last day of puja.

According to some scholars, the ritual of immersing the Durga sculpture-idol into the river attracted the attention of colonial era travelers to the Bengal region from Europe, such as Garcin de Tassy and Emma Roberts. In 1831, Tassy reported that similar rituals were annually observed by the Muslim community in Bengal. Shia Muslims observed Muharram over ten days, taking out processions in memory of the martyrdom of Imam Husayn ibn Ali, and then cast a memorial Imam's cenotaph into a river on the tenth day. Tassy further stated that the Muslim rituals included the same offerings at the annual observation of Muharram that the Hindu rituals included during Durga Puja. According to yet other scholars, the ritual of immersion in water by Hindus for Durga Puja in Bengal and Ganesh Chaturthi in the western states of India, may have grown because members of the Hindu community attempted to create a competing procession and immersion ritual to that of Muharram, allowed by the colonial British Indian government in the 19th and early 20th-centuries.

In Maharashtra, the city of Nashik and other places such as CIDCO, Rajeevnagar, Panchavati, and Mahatmanagar host Durga Puja celebrations. While in Delhi, the first community Durga Puja was organized near Kashmiri Gate by a group of expatriate Bengalis, in 1910, a year before Delhi was declared the capital of British India. This group came to be the Delhi Durga Puja Samiti, popularly known as the Kashmere Gate Durga Puja. The Durga Puja at Timarpur, Delhi was started in the year 1914. In 2011, over 800 Durga Pujas were held in Delhi, with a few hundred more in Gurgaon and NOIDA.

In Odisha, Durga Puja is the most important festival of the people of the state. Durga Puja is a very important festival for Odias, during the 4 days of the festival, the streets of the city turns into a wonderland throughout the state, people welcome the arrival of their maa by rejoicing themselves, eating tasty food, wearing new clothes, seeing different pandals across the city, family gathering and gift givings. In 2019, ninety-seven pandals in Cuttack alone, Odisha were reported to bedeck respective sculpture-idols with silver jewelry for Durga Puja celebrations; such club of pandals termed regionally as Chandi Medha. The state capital is famous for the modern themes and creativity In the pandals, while the Western part of the state has a more retro decoration theme to the pandal. In the northern parts of the state particularly Balasore, Durga Puja is celebrated with much fervor and the Odia diaspora abroad especially in Australia, which originates 95% from the district of Balasore celebrates the puja in the same manner which is done back home in Balasore. In September 2019, 160 pandals were reported to be hosting Durga Puja in Cuttack.

While in Tripura there were over 2,500 community Durga Puja celebrations in 2013. Durga Puja has been started at the Durgabari temple, in Agartala by King Radha Kishore Manikya Bahadur.

Significance
Beyond being an art festival and a socio-religious event, Durga Puja has also been a political event with regional and national political parties having sponsored Durga Puja celebrations. In 2019, West Bengal Chief Minister, Mamata Banerjee announced a grant of 25,000 to all community-organised Durga Pujas in the state.

In 2019, Kolkata's Durga Puja was nominated by the Indian government for the 2020 UNESCO Representative list of the Intangible Cultural Heritage of Humanity. Durga Puja also stands to be politically and economically significant. The committees organising Durga Puja in Kolkata have close links to politicians. Politicians patronize the festival by making donations or helping raise money for funding of community pujas, or by marking their presence at puja events and inaugurations. The grant of 25,000 to puja organizing committees in West Bengal by a debt-ridden state government was reported to cost a budget a 70 crores. The state government also announced an additional grant of 5,000 to puja organizing committees fully managed by women alone, while also announcing a twenty-five percent concession on total electricity bills for puja pandal. The government had made a grant of 10,000 each to more than 20,000 puja organizing committees in the state in 2018.

A 2013 report by ASSOCHAM states West Bengal's Durga Puja to be a 25,000 crores worth economy, expected to grow at the compound annual growth rate of about 35 per-cent. Economic slowdowns in India, such as in 2019, have hence affected corporate sponsorships and puja budgets for public celebrations. In August 2019, the Income Tax Department of India had allegedly sent notices to various Durga Puja organizing committees in West Bengal, against which the ruling party of the state, All India Trinamool Congress (AITMC) protested. The Central Board of Direct Taxes denied sending any such notices, to which AITMC politician Madan Mitra is reported to have said that the intention may have been to enquire if tax deducted at source had been deducted on payments to vendors for organizing community pujas.

Economic significance
Durga Puja directly affects the economy. In 2022, the economy of West Bengal was estimated to get a boost of 50,000 crore rupees. The annual GDP of West Bengal was expected to be expanded by 20-30 percent that year. The factors responsible for this economic boost are mainly the increase of earning in transport, tourism, industry, business, shopping and other fields. The Kolkata Metro Railway recorded an earning of ₹6 crore in just five days of Durga Puja in 2022. 

The famous puja pandals get sponsorship from renowned companies and labels. Usually, the dress and jewelries of the idols, the stuffs used to make the pandals, decorations, lightings are sponsored.

Social significance
Durga Puja plays a great significance in the living of certain peoples. The kumors, those who make the idols with clay and also makes other clayey products, earns lakhs of rupees by selling a single set of Durga idol of average size. Hence, it makes their annual income because idols used in other festivals are a lot more cheaper. Other professions that receive the majority of their annual income are dhaaki (plays dhaak), priest and other small homecrafts. It is assumed that these profession based small classes would become smaller in population if Durga Puja was absent.

Media attention

The day of Mahalaya is marked by the Bengali community with Mahishasuramardini — a two-hours long All India Radio program — that has been popular in the Bengali community since the 1950s. While in earlier days it used to be recorded live, a pre-recorded version has come to be broadcast in recent decades. Bengalis traditionally wake up at four in the morning on Mahalaya to listen to the radio show, primarily involving recitations of chants and hymns from Devi Mahatmyam (or Chandi Path) by Birendra Krishna Bhadra and Pankaj Kumar Mullick. The show also features various devotional melodies.

Dramas enacting the legend of Durga slaying Mahishasura are telecasted on the television. Radio and television channels also air other festive shows, while Bengali and Odia magazines publish special editions for the puja known as Pujabarshiki (Annual Puja Edition) or Sharadiya Sankhya (Autumnal Volume). These contain works of writers, both established and upcoming, and are more voluminous than the regular issues. Some notable examples of such magazines in Bengali are Anandamela, Shuktara, Desh, Sananda, Nabakallol, and Bartaman.

Celebrations outside India

Durga Puja is celebrated commonly by Bangladesh's Hindu community. Some Bengali Muslims also take part in the festivities. In Dhaka, the Dhakeshwari Temple puja attracts visitors and devotees. In Nepal, the festivities are celebrated as Dashain.

Beyond south Asia, Durga Puja is organized by Bengali communities in the United States of America. Durga Puja celebrations have also been started in Hong Kong by the Bengali diaspora.

In Canada, Bengali Hindu communities both from Bangladesh and West Bengal, India organise several Durga Pujas. Greater Toronto Area has the most number of Durga Puja celebration venues organized by different Bengali cultural groups such as Bangladesh Canada Hindu Cultural Society (BCHCS), Bongo Poribar Sociocultural Association etc. City of Toronto has a dedicated Durga Temple named Toronto Durgabari where Durga Puja is organized along with other Hindu celebrations. Most of the puja venues of Toronto area try to arrange the puja in best possible way to follow the lunar calendar and timings.

Celebrations are also organized in Europe. The sculpture-idols are shipped from India and stored in warehouses to be re-used over the years. According to BBC News, for community celebrations in London in 2006, these "idols, belonging to a tableau measuring 18ft by 20ft, were made from clay, straw and vegetable dyes". At the end of the puja, the sculpture-idols were immersed in River Thames for the first time in 2006, after "the community was allowed to give a traditional send-off to the deities by London's port authorities". In Germany, the puja is celebrated in Cologne, and other cities. In Switzerland, puja in Baden, Aargau has been celebrated since 2003. In Sweden, the puja is celebrated in cities such as Stockholm and Helsingborg. In the Netherlands, the puja is celebrated in places such as Amstelveen, Eindhoven, and Voorschoten. In Japan, Durga Puja is celebrated in Tokyo with much fanfare.

Footnotes

References

Bibliography

 
 
 
 
 
 
 
 
 
 
 
 
 
 
 
 
 
 
 
 
 
 
 
 
 
 
 
 
 
 
 
 
 
 
 
 
 
 
 
 
 
 
 
 
 
 
 Sen Ramprasad (1720–1781). Grace and Mercy in Her Wild Hair: Selected Poems to the Mother Goddess. Hohm Press. .

Further reading

 Banerjee, Sudeshna (2004). Durga Puja: Yesterday, Today and Tomorrow. Rupa and Co, Calcutta. .
 
 Dutta, Krishna. (2003) Calcutta: a cultural and literary history . Signal Books, Oxford, United Kingdom. .
  (Chapter 6: "Of Public Sphere and Sacred Space: Origins of Community Durga Puja in Bengal.")
 Saraswati, Swami Satyananda (2001). Durga Puja Beginner, Devi Mandir. .

External links

 
 

 
Bengali festivals
Festivals in West Bengal
Festivals in Odisha
Festivals in Assam
Hindu festivals
September observances
October observances